Cascade National Park is a national park located in New South Wales, Australia,  northeast of Sydney.

The park covers 3,700ha of temperate and subtropical rainforest.

See also
 Protected areas of New South Wales

References

National parks of New South Wales
Protected areas established in 1999
1999 establishments in Australia